William H. Brennan (February 12, 1893 – October 19, 1950) was an American football player who played eight seasons for the Chicago Cardinals.

References

1893 births
1950 deaths
Players of American football from Chicago
American football offensive linemen
Chicago Cardinals players